The women's pole vault competition of the athletics events at the 2019 Pan American Games took place on 8 August at the 2019 Pan American Games Athletics Stadium. The defending Pan American Games champion was Yarisley Silva from Cuba, who again won the gold medal. It marked her third successive championship and fourth straight medal.

Summary
Five were over 4.55m, with Alysha Newman and Katie Nageotte still with perfect rounds going. At 4.65m, defending champion Yarisley Silva got over on her first attempt taking the lead. Nageotte got over on her second attempt and when nobody else could make the height, Newman was left with bronze. At 4.70m, Nageotte reversed the situation, taking the lead my making it on her second attempt while Silva had failed two times straight. After Nageotte missed once, Silva cleared to take the lead. Nageotte tried once more at 4.75m and then passed to 4.80. After she had exhausted her attempts, Silva's third championship in a row was confirmed.

Records
Prior to this competition, the existing world and Pan American Games records were as follows:

Schedule

Results
All times shown are in meters.

Final
The results were as follows:

References

Athletics at the 2019 Pan American Games
2019